Bloxworth is a village and civil parish in the English county of Dorset, within Wareham Forest on the A35 road  west of Poole. In the 2011 census the civil parish had 80 households and a population of 200. Bloxworth Heath is home to Woolsbarrow Hillfort.

To the northwest of the village is Bloxworth House, the first brick building in Dorset.

The hamlet of East Bloxworth lies about a mile to the east of the village.

References

External links 

Villages in Dorset